Thomas Luny (1759–1837), born in Cornwall, probably at St Ewe, was an English artist and painter, mostly of seascapes and other marine-based works.
At the age of eleven, Luny left Cornwall to live in London. There he became the apprentice of Francis Holman, a marine painter who would have a great and long lasting artistic influence on Luny: Luny remained until 1780 in Holman's London studio, which, was first situated in Broad Street, St. George's, and later relocated to Old Gravel Lane.

In September 1777, Luny left Holman's studio for a while, to journey to France. During this particular expedition, Luny almost certainly strayed from France itself; his first exhibited picture in London, seen at the Society of Artists that same year, was given the title A distant view of the island of Madeira and Porto Santo, suggesting that an engraving had inspired his choice of subject. Similarly, it is unlikely that Luny was on hand for the Battle of the Nile, 1798, and the bombardment of Algiers, 1816, both of which he illustrated with dramatic atmosphere and credible realism.

After leaving Holman's studio in 1780, Luny moved to Leadenhall Street during 1783. It was around this time that Luny was frequently exhibiting  at the Royal Academy, in a total of twenty-nine exhibitions between 1780 and 1802. In Leadenhall Street, Luny became acquainted with a "Mr. Merle",  a dealer and framer of paintings who promoted Luny's paintings for over twenty years, to great success. Luny also found a wealthy source of business in Leadenhall Street, where the British East India Company had their headquarters; their officers commissioned many paintings and portraits from Luny. This relationship between the Company and Luny also had several non-monetary benefits for Luny; it seems probable that, considering the great detail and realistic look of many of his sketches of locations such as Naples, Gibraltar, and Charleston, South Carolina, Luny was occasionally invited as a guest on the company's ships on special occasions and voyages.

Several years later, in 1807, Luny decided to move again, this time to Teignmouth in Devon. There he received a number of commissions (mostly from ex-mariners, local gentry, and the like), and he continued to be as successful in his work as he had been in London. Luny was by that time suffering with arthritis in both of his hands. This had no obvious impact on the quality or pace of his artistic work. In fact, of his lifetime oeuvre of over 3,000 works, over 2,200 were produced between 1807 and his death. He died on 30 September 1837.

Thomas Luny was buried in the graveyard of St James' Church, the parish church of Teignmouth, alongside his half-brother Captain James Wallace, who had fought at the Battle of Copenhagen (1801) under Nelson's command.

Specimens of his work are exhibited at the National Maritime Museum at Greenwich, in the Royal Albert Memorial Museum in Exeter, and at The Mariners' Museum in Newport News, Virginia.

Notes

External links 

 
Engagement Between Sir George Brydges Rodney and the Spanish Squadron, Commanded by Don Juan de Langara, Near Cape St. Vincent, 16 January 1780 - Rehs Galleries' biography on Thomas Luny and an image of his 1872 Royal Academy exhibition painting.

18th-century English painters
English male painters
19th-century English painters
British marine artists
People from St Ewe
1759 births
1837 deaths
19th-century English male artists
18th-century English male artists